Gmina Wądroże Wielkie is a rural gmina (administrative district) in Jawor County, Lower Silesian Voivodeship, in south-western Poland.

Neighbouring gminas
Gmina Wądroże Wielkie is bordered by the gminas of Legnickie Pole, Malczyce, Mściwojów, Ruja, Środa Śląska and Udanin.

Villages
The gmina contains the villages of Augustów, Bielany, Biernatki, Budziszów Mały, Budziszów Wielki, Dobrzany, Gądków, Granowice, Jenków, Kępy, Kosiska, Mierczyce, Pawłowice Wielkie, Postolice, Rąbienice, Skała, Sobolew, Wądroże Małe, Wądroże Wielkie and Wierzchowice.

References

Wadroze Wielkie
Jawor County